The Devil Wears Prada is a 2006 American comedy-drama film directed by David Frankel and produced by Wendy Finerman. The screenplay, written by Aline Brosh McKenna, is based on Lauren Weisberger's 2003 novel of the same name. The film adaptation stars Meryl Streep as Miranda Priestly, a powerful fashion magazine editor, and Anne Hathaway as Andrea "Andy" Sachs, a college graduate who goes to New York City and lands a job as Priestly's co-assistant. Emily Blunt and Stanley Tucci co-star as co-assistant Emily Charlton and art director Nigel Kipling, respectively. Simon Baker and Adrian Grenier play pivotal supporting roles.

In 2003, 20th Century Fox bought the rights to a film adaptation of Weisberger's novel before it was completed for publication; the project was not greenlit until Streep was cast in the lead role. Principal photography lasted 57 days, primarily taking place in New York City from October to December 2005. Additional filming was done in Paris, France.

After premiering at the LA Film Festival on June 22, 2006, The Devil Wears Prada was theatrically released in the United States on June 30. The film received positive reviews from critics, with Streep's performance being singled out for praise, thus earning her many award nominations, including an Oscar nomination for Best Actress, as well as a Golden Globe for Best Actress in a Comedy or Musical. Hathaway and Blunt also drew favorable reviews and nominations for their performances. The film grossed over $326 million worldwide, against its $41 million budget, and was the 12th highest-grossing film worldwide in 2006.

Although the film is set in the fashion world, and references well-known establishments and people within that industry, most designers and other fashion notables avoided appearing as themselves for fear of displeasing US Vogue editor Anna Wintour, who is widely believed to have been the inspiration for Priestly. Still, many allowed their clothes and accessories to be used in the film, making it one of the most expensively costumed films in history. Wintour later overcame her initial skepticism, saying she liked the film and Streep in particular.

Plot 
Andrea "Andy" Sachs is an aspiring journalist newly graduated from Northwestern University. Despite her ridicule of the fashion industry, she lands a job as junior personal assistant to Miranda Priestly, the editor-in-chief of Runway magazine, a job that "millions of girls would kill for". Andy plans to put up with Miranda's excessive demands and humiliating treatment for one year in the hopes of getting a job as a reporter or writer somewhere else.

Andy initially fumbles with her job and fits in poorly with her gossipy, fashion-forward co-workers, especially Miranda's senior assistant, Emily Charlton. After a dress trial meeting in which Miranda berates her in front of the entire team, she approaches art director Nigel to help her learn the ropes in the world of fashion. She begins to dress stylishly and makes an effort to accommodate all of Miranda's whims and fancies, which strains her relationship with her boyfriend Nate, who is frustrated that she is always at Miranda's beck and call.

Noticing Andy's changed appearance and commitment, Miranda begins to give her more responsibility and complicated tasks to handle. Slowly but surely, Andy becomes more glamorous and absorbs the Runway philosophy. Andy gradually outperforms Emily, who is consumed with the thought of attending Paris Fashion Week as Miranda's assistant and, in preparation for the event, attempts extreme diets that are dangerous to her health. When Emily is too unwell to remember important details about the guests at a charity benefit, Andy steps in to save Miranda from embarrassment and is rewarded by being asked to replace Emily as Miranda's assistant at the Paris Fashion Week. When Andy calls Emily to inform her, the latter is hit by a car. Andy relays the news to Emily while she is recovering in the hospital, much to her devastation. Nate, angered that Andy has become what she once ridiculed, breaks up with her.

In Paris, Andy learns from Miranda about her impending divorce. Later that night, Nigel tells Andy that he has accepted a job as creative director with rising designer James Holt. Andy spends the night with an attractive young writer, Christian Thompson, who tells her that Miranda is to be replaced by Jacqueline Follet as editor of Runway. Andy attempts to warn her, but Miranda sends her away.

At a luncheon later that day, Miranda announces Jacqueline as the new creative director to Holt, leaving Andy and Nigel stunned. Later, Miranda explains to Andy that she already knew of the plot to replace her and sacrificed Nigel to keep her own job. Andy is repulsed, but Miranda points out that Andy did the same to Emily by agreeing to go to Paris. When they arrive at their destination, Andy exits the car without a word and returns to New York.

Sometime later, Andy meets up with Nate, who tells her he has a new job as a sous-chef in Boston, and they agree to remain friends. The same day, Andy is interviewed and accepted to work at a major New York publication company. The editor recounts how he called Runway for a reference, and was informed by Miranda that while Andy was one of the biggest disappointments she ever had as an assistant, he would be an idiot not to hire her. Andy then calls Emily and reconciles with her by offering her the clothes she obtained in Paris. While passing the Runway office building, Andy makes eye contact with Miranda and waves at her. Miranda does not acknowledge her, but smiles to herself once she is seated in her car.

Cast 
 Meryl Streep as Miranda Priestly
 Anne Hathaway as Andrea "Andy" Sachs
 Emily Blunt as Emily Charlton
 Stanley Tucci as Nigel Kipling
 Simon Baker as Christian Thompson
 Adrian Grenier as Nate Cooper
 Gisele Bündchen as Serena
 Tracie Thoms as Lily
 Rich Sommer as Doug
 Daniel Sunjata as James Holt
 James Naughton as Stephen
 Colleen Dengel as Caroline Priestly
 Suzanne Dengel as Cassidy Priestly
 David Marshall Grant as Richard Sachs
 Tibor Feldman as Irv Ravitz
 Rebecca Mader as Jocelyn
 Alyssa Sutherland as Clacker
 Ines Rivero as Clacker at elevator
 Stéphanie Szostak as Jacqueline Follet
 David Callegati as Massimo
 Paul Keany as St. Regis Doorman

Cameos 
 Valentino Garavani
 Giancarlo Giammetti
 Carlos de Souza
 Bridget Hall
 Lauren Weisberger as the twins' nanny
 Robert Verdi as a fashion journalist in Paris who interviews Miranda
 Heidi Klum
 Jen Taylor as Lou
 Nigel Barker

Production 

Director David Frankel and producer Wendy Finerman had originally read The Devil Wears Prada in book proposal form. It would be Frankel's second theatrical feature, and his first in over a decade. He, cinematographer Florian Ballhaus and costume designer Patricia Field, drew heavily on their experience in making Sex and the City.

Frankel recalls the whole experience as having high stakes for those involved, since for himself and the others behind the camera it was the biggest project they had yet attempted, with barely adequate resources. "We knew we were on very thin ice," he told Variety for a 2016 article on the film's 10th anniversary. "It was possible this could be the end of the road for us."

Weisberger is widely believed to have based Miranda on Anna Wintour, the powerful editor of Vogue, for whom she herself had once worked as a personal assistant. Fear of what Wintour might do in retribution for any visible cooperation with the production posed obstacles, not just in the fashion industry but also in Hollywood.

Pre-production 
Fox bought the rights to Weisberger's novel before it was not only published in 2003, but even finished. Carla Hacken, then the studio's executive vice president, had only seen the first hundred pages of manuscript and an outline for how the rest of the plot was to go. But for her that was enough. "I thought Miranda Priestly was one of the greatest villains ever," she recalled in 2016. "I remember we aggressively went in and scooped it up."

Writing 
Work on a screenplay started promptly, before Weisberger had even finished her work. When it became a bestseller upon publication, elements of the plot were incorporated into the screenplay in progress. Most took their inspiration from the 2001 Ben Stiller film Zoolander and primarily satirized the fashion industry. But it was still not ready to film. Elizabeth Gabler, later head of production at Fox, noted that the finished novel did not have a complete narrative. "Since there wasn't a strong third act in the book," she said later, "we needed to invent that."

In the meantime, the studio and producer Wendy Finerman sought a director. Out of many candidates with experience in comedy, David Frankel was hired despite his limited experience, having only made one feature, Miami Rhapsody, along with some episodes of Sex and the City and Entourage. He was unsure about the property, calling it "undirectable ... a satire rather than a love story". Later, he cited Unzipped, the 1995 documentary about designer Isaac Mizrahi, as his model for the film's attitude towards fashion: "[It] revels in some of the silliness of the fashion world, but is also very serious."

At a meeting with Finerman, Frankel told her that he thought the story unnecessarily punished Miranda. "My view was that we should be grateful for excellence. Why do the excellent people have to be nice?" He prepared to move on and consider more scripts. Two days later his manager persuaded him to reconsider and look for something he liked that he could shape the film into. He took the job, giving Finerman extensive notes on the script and laying out a detailed vision for the film.

Four screenwriters worked on the property. Peter Hedges wrote the first draft, but did not think he could do more; another writer passed. Paul Rudnick did some work on Miranda's scenes, followed by a Don Roos rewrite. After that, Aline Brosh McKenna, who was able to relate her own youthful experiences attempting to launch a journalism career in New York to the story, produced a draft after a month's work that struck the right balance for Finerman and Frankel, whose notes were incorporated into a final version, rearranging the plot significantly, following the book less closely and focusing the story on the conflict between Andy and Miranda. She found the experience of writing a story with female protagonists that did not center around a relationship "very liberating ... I felt I was allowed to do what the movie wanted to be, a Faust story, a Wall Street for ladies."

McKenna also initially toned down Miranda's meanness at the request of Finerman and Frankel, only to restore it later for Streep. She later cited Don Rickles as her main influence for the insults in the dialogue; before even starting work on the screenplay she had come up with Miranda's "Take a chance. Hire the smart fat girl" line, which she felt summed up the disparity between Andy and the world she found herself in. Weisberger recalled in 2021, on the film's 15th anniversary, that McKenna's draft took it away from the "typical chick flick" direction it was going in.

In a 2017 interview with Entertainment Weekly, McKenna revealed that the character she and Frankel had the most discussions about was Andrea's boyfriend Nate. She likened his role in the story to that usually played by a male protagonist's girlfriend or wife who regularly reminds him of responsibilities at home that he has neglected. "[W]e wanted to make sure he wasn't a pain in the ass, but he is the person who is trying to say, 'Is this who you want to be morally?'"

McKenna consulted with acquaintances who worked in fashion to make her screenplay more realistic, a task she said later was difficult since many of them did not want to risk offending Wintour. In a 2010 British Academy of Film and Television Arts lecture, she told of a scene that was changed after one of these reviews, where Nigel told Andy not to complain so much about her job. Originally, she had made his speech more of a supportive pep talk, but one of those acquaintances said that would not happen: "[N]o-one in that world is nice to each other ... There's no reason to be, and they don't have time." she quoted him as saying.

Cerulean sweater speech 

The "cerulean speech", where Miranda draws the connection between the designer fashion in Runways pages and Andy's cerulean blue sweater, criticizing Andy's snobbishness about fashion and explaining the trickle-down effect, had its origins in a scene cut from earlier drafts that Streep had asked to have restored. It slowly grew from a few lines where the editor disparaged her assistant's fashion sense to a speech about "why she thought fashion was important ... She is so aware that she is affecting billions of people, and what they pick off the floor and what they are putting on their bodies in the morning." Streep said in 2016 she was interested in "the responsibility lying on the shoulders of a woman who was the head of a global brand ... That scene wasn't about the fun of fashion, it was about marketing and business."

McKenna recalls that she kept expanding it to suit Streep and Frankel, but even a few days before it was scheduled to be filmed she was unsure if it would be used or even shot. She was revising it at a nearby Starbucks when she realized that Miranda would describe something not as just blue—chosen as the color for Andy's sweater since it would work best on screen—but would instead use an exact shade. From a list of shades McKenna sent, Streep picked cerulean; the final speech takes up almost a page of the script, long for a mainstream film. "I was like, it'd be cool if half of that ended up in the movie," the writer says. "Every word is in the movie." The references to past designer collections are entirely fictional, McKenna explains, since the speech was written around the sweater's color (however, the Huffington Post later pointed out, designers often take their fashion inspiration from the streets).

The speech has become one of the film's most memorable moments; "Miranda's signature monologue" to The Ringer. "'Cerulean' [has never] sounded more sinister," the Huffington Post wrote in 2016, In 2018 New York Times chief fashion critic Vanessa Friedman invoked the speech in her defense of the importance of covering haute couture:

Morwenna Ferrier, a fashion reporter for The Guardian agreed, despite the speech's references to fictional collections. "As a fashion journalist I can vouch for its gist: that regardless of how immune you think you are to fashion, if you buy clothes, you are indebted to someone else's choice", she wrote in an article about how the fashion industry continues to embrace the speech's argument. "Arguing that you are oblivious to trends is a fashion choice in itself." As an example of how that had happened in reality since the film, she cited the yellow Guo Pei dress Rihanna wore to the 2015 Met Gala, greatly popularizing that color for clothing over the next two years. But a 2021 Study Breaks piece argues that the idea it promotes that fashion always trickles down from a cultural elite is contradicted by brands such as Vetements, which takes its inspiration from everyday streetwear, and Champion, the sportswear brand whose popularity with low-income customers helped make an elite brand those customers can no longer afford.  

In 2016, on the film's 10th anniversary, Mic wrote that the speech's logic also functioned as a critique of cultural appropriation. "In many ways, Priestley's monologue nailed the real problem with cultural appropriation: people not understanding the history or meaning behind something like cornrows or headdresses, but treating it like a new trend or accessory anyway."

Six years later, in a Slate article discussing the appeal of female characters in movies and TV who deliver incisive insults and other commentary with no apparent affect, such as those played by Aubrey Plaza, Nadira Goffe recalled Streep's "epic, unfeeling monologue" about the sweater as a "perfect example" of the archetype. "In a moment where a character would usually be showing a hint of frustration, anger, or even annoyance, Streep schools Anne Hathaway's character in a manner that feels as though she barely even thought about the words she was saying", she writes. "It gives her an air of removal, and therefore control—being straight-faced and even-toned in an emotional situation shows how little she cares, or that she's lying about caring at all."

Casting 
Once the screenplay was completed, the filmmakers and Fox focused on getting Meryl Streep to play Miranda; Carla Hacken recalled she was seen as so perfect for the part that no one had discussed any alternatives (although McKenna recalls writing provisional dialogue should the producers have had to settle for another actress). However, another source has claimed that Michelle Pfeiffer, Glenn Close, and Catherine Zeta-Jones were also considered for the part.  Weisberger, who initially could not imagine Streep playing the part, recalled that after seeing her on set it was "crystal clear" that she was perfect for the role. Her casting helped offset some of the difficulties Wintour's resistance to the film had created.

The news that Streep would meet with Frankel was celebrated at Fox. But while Streep, for her part, knew the film could be very successful, she felt the pay she was being offered for playing Miranda was "slightly, if not insulting, not perhaps reflective of my actual value to the project". The producers doubled it to around $4 million, and she signed on, allowing Fox to greenlight the film. According to Frankel, Streep saw the film as a chance to "skewer the doyennes of the fashion world". She has three daughters and, as an ardent feminist, felt that fashion magazines "twisted the minds of young women around the world and their priorities. This was an interesting way to get back at them." Also, she said, the film passed the Bechdel test.

She insisted on the cerulean sweater speech, and the scene where Miranda briefly opens up to Andy, without makeup, about her divorce. "I wanted", she explained, "to see that face without its protective glaze, to glimpse the woman in the businesswoman."

Casting Andy was more difficult. Fox wanted a young A-list actress, and felt Rachel McAdams, then coming off successes in Mean Girls and The Notebook, would help the film's commercial prospects. McAdams turned down several offers to play Andy, telling the studio she was trying to avoid mainstream Hollywood projects for a while. Kirsten Dunst, Natalie Portman, Scarlett Johansson, and Kate Hudson were other actresses considered for the role.

Anne Hathaway, by contrast, actively sought the part, tracing "Hire me" in the sand of the zen garden on Hacken's desk when she talked about the project with the executive. While Frankel liked her enough to not require her to audition, she knew she was not the studio's first choice and he would have to be patient (other accounts say that she was the only actress considered for the role). Fox production chief Elizabeth Gabler says the studio had not realized how strong her audience was after the Princess Diaries films. In one of their meetings, Gabler recalls Hathaway sitting on her couch giving her notes on the third act. While the studio did not use those notes, "her sensibilities were completely aligned with what we ended up doing." Hathaway took the part to work with Streep, but also due to some personal aspects. She celebrated when she learned she had gotten the part.

Over 100 actresses had been considered for Emily before one of the casting agents taped Emily Blunt reading some of the lines elsewhere on the Fox lot as she was leaving for her flight to London following her audition for Eragon. Although she read them in her own British accent despite the character being written as American like in the novel, Frankel was interested; Finerman liked her for her sense of humor. After the makers of Eragon cast Sienna Guillory, Frankel called her in the bathroom of "some dive club" in London, where she was consoling herself with her sister. He told her that while he would have cast her just from the tape, the studio wanted to see another audition with her dressed more in character. She insisted on continuing to play the character as British. Both Hathaway and Blunt lost weight for their roles, with Hathaway later recounting that they "would clutch at each other and cry because we were so hungry." Blunt later denied rumors she did this at the filmmakers' request.

Colleen and Suzanne Dengel, the twins who played Miranda's daughters, were cast two weeks after auditioning for Frankel and Finerman. The director and producer laughed, which the sisters believed help them get the part. They recalled in 2017 that they were excited both by being able to work together on camera for the first time, as well as the chance to act opposite Hathaway since they were big fans of the Princess Diaries films as well.

Tucci was one of the last actors cast; he agreed to play Nigel only three days before shooting started. "It was just such a beautiful piece of writing, and there's no way that you could ever say no to such a thing", he recalled. The filmmakers reportedly had auditioned Barney's creative director Simon Doonan and E!'s Robert Verdi, both openly gay men highly visible as media fashion commentators, for the part; the BBC's Graham Norton also auditioned from among 150 actors considered for the part. Verdi would later say there was no intention to actually hire him and the producers had just used him and Doonan to give whoever they ultimately did cast some filmed research to use in playing a gay character (he would end up with a walk-on part as a fashion journalist in Paris). Tucci says he was unaware of this: "All I know is that someone called me and I realized this was a great part." He based the character on various people he was acquainted with, insisting on the glasses he ultimately wore.

Daniel Sunjata had originally read for Tucci's part, rather unenthusiastically since he had just finished playing a similar character, but then read the Holt part and asked if he could audition for it. Simon Baker auditioned by sending a video of himself, wearing the same self-designed green jacket he has on when he and Andy meet for the first time.

Wintour reportedly warned major fashion designers who had been invited to make cameo appearances as themselves in the film that they would be banished from the magazine's pages if they did so; Frankel said in 2021 the most any were willing to do was help the production with background information, like allowing visits to their showrooms or giving notes on the authenticity of the script. Vogue and other major women's and fashion magazines have avoided reviewing or even mentioning the book in their pages. Wintour's spokespeople deny the claim, but costume designer Patricia Field says many designers told her they did not want to risk Wintour's wrath.

Only Valentino Garavani, who designed the black evening gown Miranda wears during the museum benefit scene, chose to make an appearance. Coincidentally, he was in New York City during production and Finerman dared Field, an acquaintance, to ask him personally. Much to her surprise, he accepted. Other cameos of note include Heidi Klum as herself and Weisberger as the twins' nanny. Streep's daughter's film debut as a barista at Starbucks was cut. Gisele Bündchen agreed to appear in the film only if she did not play a model.

Filming 

Principal photography took place over 57 days in New York and Paris between October and December 2005. The film's budget was initially $35 million and was to only include filming in New York. The limited budget caused problems with some locations—the crew could not get permission to shoot at the Museum of Modern Art or Bryant Park, which they also attribute to fear of Wintour. The co-op boards at many apartment buildings also refused to let the production use them for Miranda's, which Frankel also believes was because of Wintour's influence.

Ballhaus, at Finerman and Frankel's suggestion, composed as many shots as possible, whether interiors or exteriors, to at least partially take in busy New York street scenes in the background, to convey the excitement of working in a glamorous industry in New York. He also used a handheld camera during some of the busier meeting scenes in Miranda's office, to better convey the flow of action, and slow motion for Andrea's entrance into the office following her makeover. A few process shots were necessary, mainly to put exterior views behind windows on sets and in the Mercedes where Miranda and Andy are having their climactic conversation.

Fox originally refused permission to let Frankel shoot some scenes from the third act in Paris, where it is set, due to the low budget. After six "nightmarish" weeks of shooting, he had an editor cut a "sizzle reel" of highlights. That convinced the studio to increase the budget to allow for limited shooting overseas. Streep did not go as Fox believed it would be too expensive; green screen shots and her body double were used instead.

Acting 
Several weeks after all the major parts had been cast, the actors gathered in New York for a table read. Hathaway was nervous and goofy, she recalls, since she still had not developed her idea of the part; she described her performance at that point as "[nothing] particularly impressive". Blunt, by contrast, found Streep's laugh relaxed her enough to keep her focused on playing a nervous, distracted Emily. The highlight of the session was Streep's first line as Miranda. Instead of the "strident, bossy, barking voice" everyone expected, Hathaway says, Streep silenced the room by speaking in a near whisper. "It was so unexpected and brilliant." At the reading Streep also changed Miranda's last line to "everybody wants to be us" from the original "me".

Streep made a conscious decision not to play the part as a direct impression of Wintour, right down to not using an accent and making the character American rather than English ("I felt it was too restricting"). "I think she wanted people not to confuse the character of Miranda Priestly with Anna Wintour at all," said Frankel. "And that's why early on in the process she decided on a very different look for her and a different approach to the character." The "that's all," "please bore someone else ..." catchphrases; her coat-tossing on Andrea's desk and discarded steak lunch are retained from the novel. Streep prepared by reading a book by Wintour protégé Liz Tilberis and the memoirs of Vogue editor Diana Vreeland. She lost so much weight during shooting that the clothes had to be taken in.

During the movie's press tour she also said her performance as Miranda was inspired by different men she knew, but did not say which ones. In 2016 she disclosed to Variety that she took Miranda's soft speaking style from Clint Eastwood: "He never, ever, ever raises his voice and everyone has to lean in to listen, and he is automatically the most powerful person in the room." However, she said, Eastwood does not make jokes, so instead she modeled that aspect of the character on theatrical and film director Mike Nichols, whose delivery of a cutting remark, she said, made everyone laugh, including the target. "The walk, I'm afraid, is mine," Streep added.

For Miranda's actual look, Streep looked to two women. The bouffant hairstyle was inspired by model and actress Carmen Dell'Orefice, which Streep said she wanted to blend with "the unassailable elegance and authority of [French politician] Christine Lagarde". She wanted Miranda's hair to be white, which the producers feared would make her look too old, but the studio trusted her and she worked with makeup artist and stylist J. Roy Helland, a longtime associate, to create the look.

The costumes Field designed to go with that look resulted in numerous blown takes during the montage where Miranda repeatedly throws her overcoat on Andrea's desk when she arrives in the morning. When McKenna saw Streep as Miranda for the first time on set, she recalls being so terrified she threw her arm in front of Frankel "like we were in a car wreck".

Hathaway prepared for the part by volunteering for a week as an assistant at an auction house where she was "put through the wringer" according to Weisberger, who adds that Hathaway supplemented that by asking her many questions about working for Wintour. Frankel recalls that she was nervous through most of the shooting, particularly when working late, since Raffaello Follieri, her boyfriend at that time, preferred strongly that she not do so; she was also having health issues due to a cyst. The director said she was "terrified" before starting her first scene with Streep, who had begun her working relationship with Hathaway by saying first "I think you're perfect for the role and I'm so happy we're going to be working on this together" then warning her that was the last nice thing she would say. Streep applied this philosophy to everyone else on set as well, keeping her distance from the cast and crew members unless it was necessary to discuss something with them.

The scene where Andy delivers the Book, the mockup of the magazine in progress, to Miranda's apartment, was, according to the Dengels, who played Miranda's twin daughters, totally improvised. "That was just something we did with Anne and it made the cut," Colleen Dengel told BuzzFeed in 2017. Nevertheless, it took three more days of filming to get the shot of the girls up in the stairwell the way Frankel wanted it, a look she believes was inspired by a similar scene with twin girls in The Shining.

Improvisations 

Several of the actors contributed dialogue and scenes to the film. Streep suggested the editorial meeting scene, which does not advance the plot but shows Miranda at work without Andy present. It was also her idea that Miranda not wear makeup in the scene where she opens up to Andy and worries about the effect on her daughters of her divorce becoming public knowledge.

Hathaway suggested taking the kiss between Andy and Nate out of the scene where he makes her a grilled cheese sandwich. "I just don't think it's right…just doesn't feel like we're at that point in our relationship", Grenier recalls her saying. "There's too much history."

Blunt, for her part, contributed the line where she tells Andy "I'm hearing this", while opening and closing her hand, "and I want to hear this" keeping the other one closed. In 2015 she told Howard Stern that she had overheard a mother saying that to a child in a supermarket during production. Bündchen's "She looks good" upon seeing Andy following her makeover is likewise her improvised addition to the script; she thought it balanced Emily's meanness to Andy.

Costuming 
Frankel, who had worked with Patricia Field on his feature-film debut Miami Rhapsody as well as Sex and the City, knew that what the cast wore would be of utmost importance in a movie set in the fashion industry. "My approach was to hire her and then leave the room," he joked later. While only Valentino Garavani appeared onscreen, many other designers were helpful to Field. Frankel recalls that Prada's decision to assist Field "helped her break the ice".

The $100,000 budget for the film's costumes was supplemented by help from Field's friends throughout the industry. Ultimately, she believes, at least $1 million worth of clothing was used in the film, making it one of the most expensively costumed movies in cinema history. The single priciest item was a $100,000 Fred Leighton necklace on Streep, who likened Field's success in putting the movie's wardrobe together to the special effects in the Mission: Impossible films.

When Hathaway enters the office after Nigel gives her access to Runway's closet, she is dressed entirely in Chanel. Field explained in 2016 that "I felt Annie Hathaway was a Chanel girl organically, as opposed to let's say a Versace [or Roberto Cavalli] girl." When she called the company to ask for assistance, they were delighted because "they wanted to see Chanel on a young girl to give it another point of view," showing it as a brand for "not just middle-aged women in suits, but youthful and funky." Calvin Klein rounds out Andrea's wardrobe. Most of the garments seen onscreen were borrowed; Streep recalls not being able to eat spaghetti at lunch while wearing one dress because if it got soiled the production could not return it.

Dolce & Gabbana and Calvin Klein helped Field as well, with some contributions from Lebanese designer Georges Chakra. Although Field avoids making Streep look like Wintour, she dresses her in generous helpings of Prada (By Field's own estimate, 40 percent of the shoes on Streep's feet are Prada). "I know her character was originally based on Anna Wintour," Field said, "but I didn't want to copy someone's style." But, like Wintour and her Vogue predecessor Diana Vreeland, the two realized that Miranda needed a signature look, which was provided primarily by the white wig and forelock she wore as well as the clothes the two spent much time poring over look-books for. "[I]n choosing her wardrobe my idea was that she's a chief fashion editor, she has her own style," Fields told Women's Wear Daily in 2016. "We're creating an original character."

Blunt recalls that she and Streep generally wore the shoes that came with their outfits only when they were shown in full. Whenever only their upper bodies needed to be visible, they put on more comfortable footwear like Uggs. Hathaway, by contrast, always wore whatever shoes she had been given. "[She was running] over cobblestone streets like a sure-footed little mountain goat", Blunt recalls.

Field said she avoided prevailing fashion trends for Miranda during production in favor of a more timeless look based on Donna Karan archives and pieces by Michaele Vollbracht for Bill Blass. She did not want people to easily recognize what Miranda was wearing.

She contrasted Andy and Emily by giving Andy a sense of style, without much risk-taking, that would suggest clothing a fashion magazine would have on hand for shoots, clothing a recent college graduate with little sense of style would feel comfortable wearing in a fashion-conscious workplace. Blunt, on the other hand was "so on the edge she's almost falling off". For her, Field chose pieces by Vivienne Westwood and Rick Owens to suggest a taste for funkier, more "underground" clothing. After the film's release, some of the looks Field chose became popular, to the filmmakers' amusement.

Tucci praised Field's skill in putting ensembles together that were not only stylish but helped him develop his character:

He found one Dries van Noten tie he wore during the film to his liking and kept it.

Production design 
After touring some offices of real fashion magazines, Jess Gonchor gave the Runway offices a clean, white look meant to suggest a makeup compact ("the chaste beiges and whites of impervious authority," Denby called it). Miranda's office bears some strong similarities to the real office of Anna Wintour, down to an octagonal mirror on the wall, photographs and a floral arrangement on the desk. Gonchor later told Women's Wear Daily that he had based the set on a photo of Wintour's office he found online; the similarity led Wintour to have her office redecorated after the movie's release. In 2021, Frankel said Gonchor had actually managed to sneak into Vogues offices to get a look at Wintour's. "They got it really, really close", Weisberger said.

Gonchor even chose separate computer wallpaper to highlight different aspects of Blunt's and Hathaway's character: Paris's Arc de Triomphe on Blunt's suggests her aspirations to accompany Miranda to the shows there, while the floral image on Andy's suggests the natural, unassuming qualities she displays at the outset of her tenure with the magazine. For the photo of Andy with her parents, Hathaway posed with her own mother and David Marshall Grant. The Dengel twins recalled being asked every day for three years straight if the Harry Potter advance copies were real; to their great disappointment they were not and in fact were "all gibberish". They eventually auctioned them for $586 on eBay, along with various clothing used in the film, to benefit Dress for Success, a charity which provides business clothing to help women transition into the workforce.

Locations

New York 
 The 1221 Avenue of the Americas on Sixth Avenue was used for the exteriors and lobby of Elias-Clarke's headquarters.
 The Runway offices are partially corridors in the neighboring Fox building and partially sets.
 The Elias-Clarke cafeteria is the one at the Reuters office in Manhattan.
 Nate and Andy's apartment is on the Lower East Side.
 Andy gets on the subway at the Spring Street station and gets off at 51st Street, both on the Lexington Avenue Line.
 Bubby's, the restaurant Nate works at (and where Andrea, Doug and Lily eat dinner on occasion) is in TriBeCa.
 The Smith & Wollensky steakhouse and its kitchen were used.
 The Calvin Klein showroom is used in the deleted scenes.
 Holt's studio is a loft used by an actual designer.
 The American Museum of Natural History was used for the exterior of the museum benefit, while the lobby of one of the Foley Square courthouses is used for the interior.
 The Priestly townhouse is on the Upper East Side and belongs to a friend of Finerman's. It had to be dressed on short notice after another one could not be used.
 Christian gives Andy the unpublished Harry Potter manuscript at the St. Regis Hotel's King Cole Bar.
 The Amtrak train the twins are taking is going up the Hudson River at Haverstraw Bay.
 Streep exits her limousine, supposedly in Paris, at 77th Street and Central Park West.
 The New York Mirror newsroom where Andy gets hired at the end of the film is that of the now-defunct New York Sun.
 The café where Andy apologizes to Nate was the Mayrose at 920 Broadway (near the Flatiron Building), which has since closed. On its site is a Flying Tiger Copenhagen store.

Paris 
The crew were in Paris for only two days, and used only exteriors. Streep did not make the trip.
 The fountain Andy throws her phone into is on the Place de la Concorde.
 All the hotel interiors are actually the St. Regis in Manhattan. The fashion shows were filmed on a soundstage in Queens. Likewise, Christian's hotel is the W Hotel at Times Square.

Post-production

Editing 
Mark Livolsi realized, as McKenna had on the other end, that the film worked best when it focused on the Andrea-Miranda storyline. Accordingly, he cut a number of primarily transitional scenes, such as Andrea's job interview and the Runway staff's trip to Holt's studio. He also took out a scene early on where Miranda complimented Andrea. Upon reviewing them for the DVD, Frankel admitted he had not even seen them before, since Livolsi did not include them in any prints he sent to the director.

Frankel praised Livolsi for making the film's four key montages—the opening credits, Miranda's coat-tossing, Andrea's makeover and the Paris introduction—work. The third was particularly challenging as it uses passing cars and other obstructions to cover Hathaway's changes of outfit. Some scenes were also created in the editing room, such as the reception at the museum, where Livolsi wove B-roll footage in to keep the action flowing.

In 2021 McKenna estimated that she had signed off on $10 million in cut scenes. An opening scene in which Andy goes to the wrong building on her way to her interview was taken out to get the story started more quickly. The scene where she misses Nate's birthday was originally more elaborate, with the couple supposed to meet up with their friends at a concert, but that proved to be too expensive, and so the scene with the cupcake was written instead. "We had many versions of that." And an alternate ending for the couple's arc, where they have the same conversation about the future of their relationship while running through the park, was filmed but replaced with the less optimistic scene in the restaurant.

McKenna had also been willing to cut Miranda's "Florals... for spring. Groundbreaking" line, but Frankel had it kept in.

Music 

Composer Theodore Shapiro relied heavily on guitar and percussion, with the backing of a full orchestra, to capture a contemporary urban sound. He ultimately wrote 35 minutes of music for the film, which were performed and recorded by the Hollywood Studio Symphony, conducted by Pete Anthony. His work was balanced with songs by U2 ("City of Blinding Lights", Miranda and Andy in Paris), Madonna ("Vogue" & "Jump", Andrea's fashion montage & her first day on the job, respectively), KT Tunstall ("Suddenly I See", female montage during opening credits), Alanis Morissette ("Crazy", Central Park photo shoot), Bitter:Sweet ("Our Remains," Andy picks up James Holt's sketches for Miranda; Bittersweet Faith, Lily's art show), Azure Ray ("Sleep," following the breakdown of her relationship with Nate), Jamiroquai ("Seven Days in Sunny June," Andy and Christian meet at James Holt's party) among others. Frankel had wanted to use "City of Blinding Lights" in the film after he had used it as a soundtrack to a video montage of Paris scenes he had put together after scouting locations there. Likewise, Field had advocated just as strongly for "Vogue".

The soundtrack album was released on July 11, 2006, by Warner Music. It includes most of the songs mentioned above, as well as a suite of Shapiro's themes. Among the tracks not included is "Suddenly I See," an omission which disappointed many fans.

Pre-release and marketing 

Originally intended just to convince Fox to fund some shooting in Paris, Frankel's sizzle reel led the studio to put a stronger marketing push behind the movie. It moved the release date from February to summer, scheduling it as a lighter alternative audiences could consider to Superman Returns at the end of June 2006, and began to position it as an event movie in and of itself.

Two decisions by the studio's marketing department that were meant to be preliminary wound up being integral to promoting the film. The first was the creation of the red stiletto heel ending in a pitchfork as the film's teaser poster. It was so successful and effective, becoming almost "iconic" (in Finerman's words), that it was used for the actual release poster as well. It became a brand, and was eventually used on every medium related to the film—the tie-in reprinting of the novel and the soundtrack and DVD covers as well.

The studio also put together a trailer of scenes and images strictly from the first three minutes of the film, in which Andy meets Miranda for the first time, to be used at previews and film festivals until they could create a more standard trailer drawing from the whole film. But, again, this proved so effective with early audiences it was retained as the main trailer, since it created anticipation for the rest of the film without giving anything away.

Gabler credits the studio's marketing team for being "really creative". Fox saw the film as "counter-programming" on the weekend Superman Returns was released. While they knew that the material and Hathaway would help draw a younger female audience that would not be as interested in seeing that film, "[w]e didn't want it to just seem like a chick flick coming out."

Reception

Critical response 
On Rotten Tomatoes the film holds an approval rating of 75% based on 195 reviews, along with an average rating of 6.7/10. The website's critics consensus reads, "A rare film that surpasses the quality of its source novel, this Devil is a witty expose of New York's fashion scene, with Meryl Streep in top form and Anne Hathaway more than holding her own." On Metacritic, the film has a weighted average score of 62 out of 100, based on 40 critics, indicating "generally favorable reviews". Audiences surveyed by CinemaScore gave the film an average grade "B" on an A+ to F scale.

Initial reviews of the film focused primarily on Streep's performance, praising her for making an extremely unsympathetic character far more complex than she had been in the novel. "With her silver hair and pale skin, her whispery diction as perfect as her posture, Ms. Streep's Miranda inspires both terror and a measure of awe," wrote A. O. Scott in The New York Times. "No longer simply the incarnation of evil, she is now a vision of aristocratic, purposeful and surprisingly human grace."

Kyle Smith agreed at the New York Post: "The snaky Streep wisely chooses not to imitate Vogue editrix Anna Wintour, the inspiration for the book, but creates her own surprisingly believable character."

David Edelstein, in New York magazine, criticized the film as "thin", but praised Streep for her "fabulous minimalist performance". J. Hoberman, Edelstein's onetime colleague at The Village Voice, called the movie an improvement on the book and said Streep was "the scariest, most nuanced, funniest movie villainess since Tilda Swinton's nazified White Witch [in 2005's The Chronicles of Narnia: The Lion, the Witch and the Wardrobe]".

Blunt, too, earned some favorable notice. "[She] has many of the movie's best lines and steals nearly every scene she's in," wrote Clifford Pugh in the Houston Chronicle. Other reviewers and fans concurred. While all critics were in agreement about Streep and Blunt, they pointed to other weaknesses, particularly in the story. Reviewers familiar with Weisberger's novel assented to her judgment that McKenna's script greatly improved upon it. An exception was Angela Baldassare at The Microsoft Network Canada, who felt the film needed more of the nastiness others had told her was abundant in the novel.

David Denby summed up this response in his New Yorker review: "The Devil Wears Prada tells a familiar story, and it never goes much below the surface of what it has to tell. Still, what a surface!" Reactions to Hathaway's performance were not as unanimous as for many of her costars. Denby said "she suggests, with no more than a panicky sidelong glance, what Weisberger takes pages to describe." Whereas, Baldassare said she "barely carrie[d] the load".

Depiction of fashion industry 
Some media outlets allowed their present or former fashion reporters to weigh in on how realistic the movie was. Their responses varied widely. Booth Moore at Los Angeles Times chided Field for creating a "fine fashion fantasy with little to do with reality," a world that reflects what outsiders think fashion is like rather than what the industry actually is. Unlike the movie, in her experience fashionistas were less likely to wear makeup and more likely to value edgier dressing styles (that would not include toe rings).
"If they want a documentary, they can watch the History Channel", retorted Field. Fashion writer, Hadley Freeman of The Guardian, likewise complained the film was awash in the sexism and clichés that, to her, beset movies about fashion in general.

But Charla Krupp, the executive editor of SHOP, Inc., wrote, "It's the first film I've seen that got it right ... [It] has the nuances of the politics and the tension better than any film—and the backstabbing and sucking-up." Joanna Coles, the editor of the U.S. edition of Marie Claire, agreed:

The film brilliantly skewers a particular kind of young woman who lives, breathes, thinks fashion above all else ... those young women who are prepared to die rather than go without the latest Muse bag from Yves Saint Laurent that costs three times their monthly salary. It's also accurate in its understanding of the relationship between the editor-in-chief and the assistant.

Ginia Bellefante, former fashion reporter for The New York Times, called it "easily the truest portrayal of fashion culture since Unzipped (1995)" and giving it credit for depicting the way fashion had changed in the early 21st century. Her colleague Ruth La Ferla found a different opinion from industry insiders after a special preview screening. Most found the fashion in the movie too safe and the beauty too overstated, more in tune with the 1980s than the 2000s. "My job is to present an entertainment, a world people can visit and take a little trip," responded Field.

Commercial 
On its June 30 opening weekend, right before the Independence Day holiday, the film was on 2,847 screens. Through that Sunday, July 2, it grossed $27 million, second only to the big-budget Superman Returns, breaking The Patriot's six-year-old record for the largest take by a movie released that holiday weekend that did not win the weekend; a record that stood until Ice Age: Dawn of the Dinosaurs broke it in 2009.

During its first week it added $13 million. This success led Fox to add 35 more screens the next weekend, the widest domestic distribution the film enjoyed. Although it was never any week's top-grossing film, it remained in the top 10 through July. Its theatrical run continued through December 10, shortly before the DVD release.

"The core marketing was definitely to women," Gabler recalls, "but the men didn't resist going to the movie." She felt that male viewers responded favorably to the movie because they sought a glimpse inside fashion, and because Miranda "was enjoyable to watch". The release date helped generate word of mouth when people who had seen it discussed it at holiday gatherings. "They were talking about it, like a summer reading book," said Gabler.

It had a very successful run in theaters, making nearly $125 million in the United States and Canada and over $325 million worldwide, a career-high for all three top-billed actresses at that time. Streep would surpass it two years later with Mamma Mia while Hathaway exceeded it with 2010's Alice in Wonderland. Blunt would not be in a higher-grossing film until the 2014 movie adaptation of the Broadway musical Into the Woods (also starring Streep).
 It was also Tucci's highest-grossing film until Captain America: The First Avenger in 2011.

Anna Wintour 
Anna Wintour attended the film's New York premiere, wearing Prada. Her friend Barbara Amiel reported that she said shortly afterward that the movie would go straight to DVD. McKenna said later that Wintour and her daughter Bee sat in front of her and Frankel. The latter, McKenna recalls, kept telling her mother that the film got many things right.

In an interview with Barbara Walters that aired the day the DVD was released, she called the film "really entertaining" and said she appreciated the "decisive" nature of Streep's portrayal. "Anything that makes fashion entertaining and glamorous and interesting is wonderful for our industry. So I was 100 percent behind it." Streep said Wintour was "probably more upset by the book than the film". Wintour's popularity skyrocketed after her portrayal in The Devil Wears Prada. Streep said she did not base her character in The Devil Wears Prada on Anna Wintour, instead saying she was inspired by men she had known previously: "Unfortunately you don't have enough women in power, or at least I don't know them, to copy."

Frankel believes Wintour may still harbor some hard feelings about the movie. He was again seated behind her some years later at a tennis tournament in Miami, and afterwards introduced himself. When he told her that he had directed The Devil Wears Prada, he recalls, she took her hand out of the handshake.

International 

Weisberger's novel had been translated into 37 different languages, giving the movie a strong potential foreign audience. The international box office would ultimately deliver 60% of the film's gross. "We did our European premiere at the Venice Film Festival", Gabler says, where the city's gondoliers wore red T-shirts with the film's logo. "So many people around the world were captivated by the glossy fashion world. It was sexy and international."

The Devil Wears Prada topped the charts on its first major European release weekend on October 9, after a strong September Oceania and Latin America opening. It would be the highest-grossing film that weekend in the United Kingdom, Spain and Russia, taking in $41.5 million overall. Continued strong weekends as it opened across the rest of Europe helped it remain atop the overseas charts for the rest of the month. By the end of the year only its Chinese opening remained; it was released there at the end of February 2007 and took in $2.4 million.

The greatest portion of the $201.8 million total international box office came from the United Kingdom, with $26.5 million. Germany was next with $23.1 million, followed by Italy at $19.3 million and France at $17.9 million. Outside Europe, Japanese box office was the highest at $14.6 million, followed by Australia at $12.6 million.

Most reviews from the international press echoed the domestic response, heaping praise on Streep and the other actors, but calling the whole film "predictable". The Guardians Peter Bradshaw, who found the film "moderately entertaining," took Blunt to task, calling her a "real disappointment ... strained and awkward". In The Independent, Anthony Quinn said Streep "may just have given us a classic here" and concluded that the film as a whole was "as snappy and juicy as fresh bubblegum".

In most markets the title remained unchanged; either the English was used or a translation into the local language. The only exceptions were Chile, Colombia, Ecuador, Mexico and Venezuela, where it was El diablo que viste Prada and El diablo se viste a la moda. In Poland, the title was Diabeł ubiera się u Prady which roughly means "The Devil dresses (itself) at Prada" rather than "The Devil Wears Prada". In Italian, the title was ″Il diavolo veste Prada" which roughly means "The devil wears Prada". In Turkey, the title was "Şeytan Marka Giyer," roughly translated as "The Devil Wears Brand-Names". In Romania, the title was "Diavolul se îmbracă de la Prada," which roughly means "The Devil Dresses itself from Prada", the same construction being found in the French title, "Le Diable s'habille en Prada". The Japanese version is titled "プラダを着た悪魔", which translates as "The devil wearing Prada".

Awards and nominations 
Three months after the film's North American release (October 2006), Frankel and Weisberger jointly accepted the first Quill Variety Blockbuster Book to Film Award. A committee of staffers at the magazine made the nominations and chose the award winner. Editor Peter Bart praised both works.

The Devil Wears Prada is an energetically directed, perfect-fit of a film that has surprised some in the industry with its box-office legs. It has delighted the country, much as did Lauren Weisberger's book, which is still going strong on several national bestseller lists.

The film was honored by the National Board of Review as one of the year's ten best. The American Film Institute gave the film similar recognition.

The film received ample attention from the Hollywood Foreign Press Association when its Golden Globe Award nominations were announced in December. The film itself was in the running for Best Picture (Comedy/Musical) and Supporting Actress (for Blunt). Streep later won the Globe for Best Actress (Musical/Comedy).

In January 2007, Streep's fellow members of the Screen Actors Guild nominated her for Best Actress as well. Four days later, at the National Society of Film Critics awards, Streep won Best Supporting Actress for her work both in Devil and A Prairie Home Companion. McKenna earned a nomination from the Writers Guild of America Award for Best Adapted Screenplay.

When the British Academy of Film and Television Arts announced its 2006 nominations, Blunt, Field, McKenna and Streep were all among the nominees. Makeup artist and hairstylists Nicki Ledermann and Angel de Angelis also were nominated.

At the end of January, Streep received her 14th Academy Award nomination for Best Actress, lengthening her record from 13 for most nominations by any actor, male or female. Field received a Best Costume Design nomination as well. Neither won, but Blunt and Hathaway presented the last mentioned award, amusing the audience by slipping into their characters for a few lines, nervously asking which of them had gotten Streep her cappuccino. Streep played along with a stern expression before smiling.

In other media 
The success of the film led to a proposed, but unrealized, American dramedy series that was in contention to air for the 2007–08 television season on Fox. It was to be produced by Fox Television Studios, with the premise adjusted for the confines of a traditional half-hour or one-hour dramedy with a single camera set-up. However, it never reached the point of even producing a pilot episode.

With the video release came renewed interest in Weisberger's novel. It ranked eighth on USA Today's list of 2006 best sellers and was the second most borrowed book in American libraries. The audiobook version was released in October 2006 and quickly made it to third on that medium's fiction best seller list.

Home media  
The DVD was released on December 12, 2006, and has, in addition to the film, the following extras:
 Audio commentary from Frankel, editor Mark Livolsi, Field, screenwriter Aline Brosh McKenna, producer Wendy Finerman and cinematographer Florian Ballhaus.
 A five-minute blooper reel featuring, among other shots, unintentional pratfalls by Hathaway due to the high stiletto heels she had to wear. It also includes gag shots such as a chubby crewmember in loose-fitting clothing walking along the runway at the fashion show, and Streep announcing "I have some nude photographs to show you" at the Paris brunch scene. Unlike most blooper reels, it is not a collection of sequential takes but rather a fast-paced montage set to music from the film with many backstage shots and a split screenshot allowing the viewer to compare the actual shot with the blooper. The many shots of actors touching their noses are, Rich Sommer says, a game played to assign blame for ruined takes.
 Five featurettes
 "Trip to the Big Screen", a 12-minute look at the film's pre-production, discussing the changes made from the novel, how Frankel was chosen to direct and other issues.
 "NYC and Fashion", a look at the real New York fashion scene and how it is portrayed in the film.
 "Fashion Visionary Patricia Field", a profile of the film's costume designer.
 "Getting Valentino", covering how the designer was persuaded to appear as himself in the film.
 "Boss from Hell", a short segment on difficult, nightmarish superiors like Priestly.
 Fifteen deleted scenes, with commentary from Frankel and Livolsi available (see below).
 The theatrical trailer, and promotional spots for the soundtrack album and other releases.

Closed captions in French and Spanish are also available. The DVD is available in both full screen and widescreen versions. Pictures of the cast and the tagline "Hell on Heels" were added to the red-heel image for the cover. It was released in the UK on February 5, 2007.

A Blu-ray Disc of the film was released simultaneously with the DVD. The Blu-ray maintains the same features as the DVD; however, the featurettes were dropped and replaced with a subtitle pop-up trivia track that can be watched by itself or along with the audio commentary.

Reception 
Immediately upon its December 12 release, it became the top rental in the United States. It held that spot through the end of the year, adding another $26.5 million to the film's grosses; it dropped out of the top 50 at the end of March, with its grosses almost doubling. The following week it made its debut on the DVD sales charts in third position. By the end of 2007 it had sold nearly 5.6 million units, for a total of $94.4 million in sales.

Deleted scenes 
Among the deleted scenes are some that added more background information to the story, with commentary available by the editor and director. Most were deleted by Livolsi in favor of keeping the plot focused on the conflict between Miranda and Andrea, often without consulting Frankel.

Frankel generally approved of his editor's choices, but differed on one scene, showing more of Andy on her errand to the Calvin Klein showroom. He felt that scene showed Andrea's job was about more than running personal errands for Miranda.

A different version of the scene at the gala was the subject of a 2017 discussion on Twitter when it was rediscovered by Spencer Althouse, BuzzFeeds community manager. In it, instead of Andy reminding Miranda of a guest's name after the sickened Emily cannot, Miranda's husband shows up and makes rude comments to not only his wife but Ravitz, the head of Elias-Clark. Andy earns a silent "thank you" from Miranda when she helps prevent the confrontation from escalating by diverting Ravitz with a question of her own.

Althouse and many of the other participants on the thread disagreed as to whether it should have been used; those who said it was properly cut believed that it would have been out of character for Miranda at that point in the film. All agreed, as Glamour wrote, that "[t]his one, brief exchange would have completely changed the movie."

Cultural impact and legacy 

In 2016, around the 10th anniversary of the film's release, Vanity Fair did a rundown of some Independence Day weekend movie box results from the previous 15 years, noting how some better-remembered films had been bested by films that have not stood the test of time. It called Superman Returns' win over The Devil Wears Prada the "most ironic" of these victories. "[T]he degree to which The Devil Wears Prada has penetrated pop culture needs no explanation–as does the degree to which Superman Returns didn't."

The cast's opinions on why the movie has endured differ. Hathaway told Variety that she thinks many people relate to Andy's predicament of working for someone who seems impossible to please. "Everybody has had an experience like this." Tucci did not believe specific explanations were necessary. "It's a fucking brilliant movie ... The brilliant movies become influential, no matter what they are about."

Cast 

The cast members bonded tightly on the set, and remained close afterwards. Blunt invited them to her wedding to John Krasinski in 2010. There, Tucci met her sister Felicity, whom he later married. "Ten years after The Devil Wears Prada, Stanley is in my actual family," she told Variety. "How frightening is that?"

In its anniversary story, Variety argued that it had benefited all three of its lead actresses. In addition to Streep's record-setting Oscar nomination, the magazine observed, it had proven that she could be a box-office draw by herself, opening doors up for her to be cast as a lead in later summer movies such as Mamma Mia! (2008) and Julie & Julia (2009). For Hathaway, it was her first leading role in a film intended for an adult audience. Subsequent producers were impressed that she had held her own playing opposite Streep, which led eventually to her being cast in more serious roles like Rachel Getting Married (2008) and Les Misérables (2012), for which she won an Oscar. "I think what people saw was promising—it made people want to see more."

Hathaway believes that Blunt's career took off because of her role. "I've never witnessed a star being born before," Hathaway says. "That's the first time I watched it happen." Blunt agrees that it was "a night and day change" for her—the day after the film was released, she told Variety, the staff at the coffee shop she had been going to for breakfast every morning in Los Angeles suddenly recognized her. Even ten years later, people still quote her lines from the film back to her at least once a week, she says.

Audience demographics 

"[The film] definitely paved the way for the filmmakers and distributors of the world to know that there was a female audience that was really strong out there", Gabler recalls, one that was not segmented by age. She pointed to later movies, such as Mamma Mia!, 27 Dresses (2008) (written by McKenna) and Me Before You (2016), that appeared to her to be trying to replicate The Devil Wears Prada's success with that demographic. However, Gabler feels they did not do so as well. "Prada reminds me of movies that we don't have a lot of now—it harkens back to classic movies that had so much more than just one kind of plot line ... You just keep wanting to find something that can touch upon the same zeitgeist as this film."

For Streep, the most significant thing about the film was that "[t]his was the first time, on any movie I have ever made, where men came up to me and said, 'I know what you felt like, this is kind of like my life.' That was for me the most ground-breaking thing about Devil Wears Prada—it engaged men on a visceral level," she told Indiewire.

Popular culture and society 

The film has made a lasting impact on popular culture. Although a TV series based on it was not picked up, in the years after its release The Simpsons titled an episode "The Devil Wears Nada" and parodied some scenes. The American version of The Office began an episode with Steve Carell as Michael Scott imitating Miranda after watching the film on Netflix. On episode 18 of season 14 of Keeping Up with the Kardashians, Kris Jenner dressed as Miranda, channeling her 'Boss Lady' persona. In 2019, reports that Minnesota Senator Amy Klobuchar, then seeking the Democratic presidential nomination for the 2020 election, mistreated her staff and made unreasonable demands of them led some writers to invoke Miranda as a point of reference.

In 2008, The New York Times wrote that the movie had defined the image of a personal assistant in the public mind. Seven years later, Dissent's Francesca Mari wrote about "the assistant economy" by which many creative professionals rely on workers so titled to do menial personal and professional tasks for them; she pointed to The Devil Wears Prada as the best-known narrative of assistantship. The next year, writing about a proposed change in U.S. federal overtime regulations that was seen as threatening to that practice, the Times called it the 'Devil Wears Prada' economy", a term other news outlets also used.

On the film's 10th anniversary, Alyssa Rosenberg wrote in The Washington Post that Miranda anticipated female antiheroines of popular television series of the later 2000s and 2010s such as Scandals Olivia Pope and Cersei Lannister in Game of Thrones. Like them, she observes, Miranda competently assumes a position of authority often held by male characters, despite her moral failings, that she must defend against attempts to use her personal life to remove her from it, to "prov[e], as a creature of sentiment, that she never belonged there in the first place." In doing so, however successfully to herself and others, "she has zipped herself into a life as regimented and limited as a skintight pencil skirt."

Five years later, Harper's Bazaar, took a different perspective. Mekia Rivas faulted the film's portrayal of Miranda and Andy's relationship as reinforcing a false belief that since a young woman may only get one career break, she should take it no matter what she has to put up with from her boss. At the time of the film's release, "girlbosses" epitomized by Miranda had been seen as potentially revolutionizing the workplace, she noted. But the idea had since been discredited by real-life examples of women like Elizabeth Holmes and Steph Korey who ran companies where workers lived in fear of their bosses' tempers and whims. Rivas described Miranda as "a totally toxic superior who, in the end, was more interested in upholding the status quo than in reinventing it, despite having all the power and authority to do so. She wanted Andy to believe that saying no to her would be the end of her career, even though she knew Andy had all the potential in the world to make it without her or her connections."

"Like many instant classics, Prada benefited from perfect timing", Variety's 2016 article observed, attempting to explain the film's enduring appeal. "It marked the beginning of the democratization of the fashion industry—when the masses started to pay attention to the business of what they wore." It credited the movie with helping stir interest in the American adaptation of the Colombian television series Ugly Betty, which debuted months after its release.

The film also has been credited with increasing interest in R.J. Cutler's documentary The September Issue, which followed Wintour and other Vogue editors as they prepared the issue for that month of 2007. Writing in The Ringer on the tenth anniversary, Alison Herman observed that "The Devil Wears Prada transformed Wintour's image from that of a mere public figure into that of a cultural icon." Once known primarily as a fashion editor, she was now "every overlord you'd ever bitched about three drinks deep at happy hour, only to dutifully fetch her coffee the next day." Ultimately, the film had effected a positive change in Wintour's image, Herman argued, "from a tyrant in chinchilla to an idol for the post-Sandberg age".

As the film turned 10, Variety's 2016 article stated, '[The characterization] showed Hollywood that it was never wise to underestimate a strong woman's worth.'

Antipathy to Nate 

Miranda has not been the only character in the film to provoke a negative reaction from viewers over time; Nate has been called the film's "real villain" by some. "He mocks her for her new interest in fashion, he trivializes the magazine she works at, and dismisses her hard work", Entertainment Weekly wrote in 2017, collecting some tweets and other posts from social media critical of the character. Many, like the writer of that piece, found it particularly upsetting that he berated Andy for missing his birthday party even though she had a good work-related reason for her absence.

McKenna defended the character. "[W]hat people focus on is that he's trying to restrict her ambition," she told EW. "But her ambition is going towards something that she doesn't really believe in, so he has a point." While she admitted he seemed "whiney" about his birthday, McKenna also pointed out that he tells Andy later that that really was not what he was upset about. She gave Grenier credit for what she admitted was a "thankless" role, saying he captured "that actual college boyfriend, that guy who's a drummer in a cool band, and plays intramural rugby, and plays guitar, and maybe took a ceramics class".

On the film's 15th anniversary, Grenier weighed in. "When that whole thing ... first came out, I couldn't get my head around it." He ultimately came to realize that he had more in the common with the character at the time and, like Nate, had not completely matured. "[Now], after taking time to reflect and much deliberation online, I can realize the truth in that perspective ... He couldn't support her like she needed because he was a fragile, wounded boy."

Hathaway was more forgiving.

Future 
In 2013, Weisberger wrote a sequel, Revenge Wears Prada. However, it does not seem likely that a film version of it, or any sequel, will be made, as two of the film's stars are not eager to do so. Streep has reportedly said that she is not interested in making a sequel for this film in particular. And while Hathaway admits she'd be interested in working with the same people, it would have to be "something totally different". The Devil Wears Prada, she told Variety "might have just hit the right note. It's good to leave it as it is."

Eight years later, Frankel said that while the studio did not ask them to consider a sequel, a meeting was held to discuss possible ideas. As they felt the movie's story had been told, and there were no good ideas, the idea was dropped. Weisberger said it was "[not] out of the realm of possibility" and discussions have been held since then, but McKenna notes that the technology involved in producing print magazines has changed considerably since 2006, such that it would no longer be necessary for an assistant in Andrea's position to bring a physical copy of the magazine in progress to the editor's residence. "It had its moment!" the screenwriter said.

Musical adaptation 

In 2015, it was reported that Broadway producer Kevin McCollum had signed a deal two years earlier with Fox to develop some of the films from its back catalog into musicals for the stage. Two he expressed particular interest in were Mrs. Doubtfire (1993) and The Devil Wears Prada. Early in 2017, McCollum announced that in partnership with Fox Stage Productions, he was developing a musical version of The Devil Wears Prada (based on both the film and the book). Sir Elton John and Shaina Taub will be writing the score and lyrics for the project with playwright Paul Rudnick, who had written some early scenes for the screenplay, writing the book and lyrics. McCollum did not say when he expected it to premiere but hoped it would eventually play on Broadway.

In July 2019, the show held its first industry-only presentation of the initial reading for the show. It featured Emily Skinner as Miranda, Krystina Alabado as Andy, Heléne Yorke as Emily and Mario Cantone as Nigel. There has been no announcement about future workshops or tryouts before the anticipated Broadway run.

In late September a premiere run was announced for July and August 2020 at the James M. Nederlander Theatre in Chicago. According to producer Kevin McCollum, it was important to director Anna D. Shapiro, artistic director of the Steppenwolf Theater Company, also located in Chicago, to have the show premiere there. Afterwards the show is expected to make its Broadway debut; where and when have not been announced.

See also 

 2006 in film

Films with similar plot elements 
 The Intern, 2000 comedy about an overworked and mistreated low-level employee at a New York fashion magazine
 Swimming with Sharks, 1994 film starring Kevin Spacey as a tyrannical movie producer and Frank Whaley as his beleaguered assistant

Lists 

 List of 2006 box office number-one films in Australia
 List of 2006 box office number-one films in Japan
 List of 2006 box office number-one films in South Korea
 List of 2006 box office number-one films in the United Kingdom
 List of American comedy films
 List of American films of 2006
 List of awards and nominations received by Anne Hathaway
 List of awards and nominations received by Emily Blunt
 List of awards and nominations received by Meryl Streep
 List of comedy films of the 2000s
 List of fiction works made into feature films (D–J)
 List of film director and composer collaborations
 List of films set in New York City
 List of films set in Paris

Notes

References

Book

External links 

 
 
 
 
 
 

2006 films
2006 comedy-drama films
2000s English-language films
20th Century Fox films
American comedy-drama films
Dune Entertainment films
Films à clef
Films about fashion in the United States
Films about journalists
Films based on American novels
Films directed by David Frankel
Films featuring a Best Musical or Comedy Actress Golden Globe winning performance
Films scored by Theodore Shapiro
Films set in New York City
Films set in Paris
Films shot in New York City
Films shot in Paris
Films with screenplays by Aline Brosh McKenna
Vogue (magazine)
Works about fashion magazine publishing
Articles containing video clips
2000s American films